William Jones Lyshon (December 30, 1887 – October 13, 1918) was an American wrestler. He competed in the Greco-Roman wrestling featherweight event at the 1912 Summer Olympics. He was killed in action during World War I.

See also
 List of Olympians killed in World War I

References

External links
 

1887 births
American military personnel of World War I
Military personnel from Pennsylvania
1918 deaths
Olympic wrestlers of the United States
Wrestlers at the 1912 Summer Olympics
American male sport wrestlers
Sportspeople from Philadelphia
American military personnel killed in World War I